The year 1918 in film involved some significant events.



Events
January 27 – Tarzan makes his film debut in Tarzan of the Apes.
March 10 – Warner Bros. release their first produced picture, My Four Years in Germany.
July – The animated The Sinking of the Lusitania is one of the first examples of animation being used for something other than comedy.
Following litigation for anti-trust activities, the Motion Picture Patents Company disbands.
Louis B. Mayer arrives in Los Angeles and forms Louis B. Mayer Pictures Corporation.
28 mm safety standard film, designed by Alexander Victor, becomes one of the earliest film formats to use "safety film" bases in order to safeguard the amateur market against nitrate fires.

Top-grossing films (U.S.)

Notable films released in 1918

Argentina 

Buenos Aires tenebroso, directed by Juan Glize
En un día de gloria, directed by Mario Gallo and Alberto Traversa
La garra porteña, directed by Juan Glize 
Sin dejar rastros, directed by Quirino Cristiani
Violeta o La reina del tango, directed by Juan Glize

France 

The Ghost of the Rancho (aka Range Busters), directed by William Worthington, starring Bryant Washburn and Rhea Mitchell, a hybrid Horror/Western/Comedy
The Tenth Symphony (La Dixième Symphonie), directed by Abel Gance, starring Séverin-Mars and Jean Toulout 
Tih Minh, directed by Louis Feuillade, starring René Cresté 
Vendemiaire, directed by Louis Feuillade

Germany 

Alraune, die Henkerstochter, genannt die rote Hanne, directed by Eugen Illes and Joseph Klein, starring Max Auzinger and Hilde Wotner; released in the U.S. as Sacrifice;  this was the 2nd film adaptation based on the 1911 novel by Hanns Heinz Ewers
Carmen, directed by Ernst Lubitsch, starring Pola Negri
Das Tagebuch des Dr. Hart (Dr. Hart's Diary), directed by Paul Leni
Eyes of the Mummy, directed by Ernst Lubitsch, starring Pola Negri and Emil Jannings
I Don't Want to Be a Man (Ich möchte kein Mann sein), directed by Ernst Lubitsch
The Other Self, aka Das Andere Ich (Austrian) directed by Fritz Freisler, starring Fritz Kortner 
The Pied Piper of Hamelin (aka Der Rettenfanger von Hameln), written and directed by Paul Wegener, starring Wegener and Lyda Salmonova

Great Britain 

The Haunted Hotel, an 11-minute comedy short directed by Fred Rains (Claude's father), starring Will Asher and Marion Peake
Victory and Peace, directed by Herbert Brenon

Hungary 

A 99-es számú bérkocsi, directed by Mihály Kertész, starring: |Cläre Lotto and Béla Lugosi 
Alraune, directed by Mihály Kertész and Edmund Fritz, starring: Géza Erdélyi and Gyula Gál (Lost film); first film adaptation based on the 1911 novel by Hanns Heinz Ewers
Casanova, directed by Alfréd Deésy, starring Alfréd Deésy
Faun, directed by Alexander Korda, starring: Gábor Rajnay and Artúr Somlay 
Mary Ann, directed by Alexander Korda, starring: Ica von Lenkeffy and Tivadar Uray
Álarcosbál ||Alfréd Deésy, starring: Béla Lugosi
A víg Özvegy, directed by Mihály Kertész 
Az ördög, directed by Mihály Kertész
Karoly bakak, directed by Zoltan Korda 
Az Élet királya, directed by Alfréd Deésy, starring Béla Lugosi and Norbert Dán; based on the 1890 Oscar Wilde novel
Küzdelem a létért, directed by Alfréd Deésy, starring: Béla Lugosi
Lili, directed by Cornelius Hintner
Lulu, directed by Mihály Kertész
A Napraforgós hölgy, directed by Mihály Kertész, starring: Lucy Doraine, Cläre Lotto and Iván Petrovich
A Víg özvegy, directed by Mihály Kertész, starring: Mihály Várkonyi, Berta Valero, Endre Boross Árpád id. Latabár, Miklós Szomory and József Bánhidy

Italy 

Fabiola directed by Enrico Guazzoni

Japan 
Akakabe Myojin (aka Kaibyo Kaidan) a Ghost-Cat film starring Matsunosuke Onoe, produced by Nikkatsu Films
Izumo Kaidan (Japanese) aka Ghost Story of Izumo, starring Matsunosuke Onoe and Kitsuraku Arashi, produced by Nikkatsu Films
Yotsuya Kaidan Jitsuhi Kanetani Goro/ The Ghost of Yotsuya (Japanese) the 2nd ever film adaptation of the 1825 stage play Yotsuya Kaidan by Tsuruya Nanboku IV; starring Matsunosuke Onoe and Sentaro Nakamura

Sweden 

The Outlaw and His Wife (Berg-Ejvind och hans hustru), directed by & starring Victor Sjöström  (aka Victor Seastrom)

United States 

Amarilly of Clothes-Line Alley, directed by Marshall Neilan, starring Mary Pickford
Among the Cannibal Isles of the South Pacific
Are Crooks Dishonest?, a Harold Lloyd short
Arizona, starring Douglas Fairbanks
The Bell Boy, a 'Fatty' Arbuckle / Buster Keaton short
The Bells, directed by Ernest C. Warde, starring Frank Keenan and Lois Wilson; this was the 4th film adaptation of Erckmann-Chatrian's 1867 stage play Le Juif Polonaise (The Polish Jew)
Black Sherlock Holmes, produced by Ebony Pictures, starring Sam Robinson as a black version of Sherlock Holmes 
'Blue Blazes' Rawden, starring William S. Hart  
The Blue Bird, directed by Maurice Tourneur
Bound in Morocco, directed by Allan Dwan, starring Douglas Fairbanks
The Burden of Proof, directed by Julius Steger; starring Marion Davies 
Cecilia of the Pink Roses, directed by Julius Steger; starring Marion Davies
The Cook, a 'Fatty' Arbuckle/Buster Keaton short
The Craving (aka Delirium) directed by Francis Ford for Universal Pictures, starring Francis Ford and Peter Gerald
Cupid Angling, starring Ruth Roland
The Eyes of Julia Deep, starring Mary Miles Minter
The Ghost of Slumber Mountain, written and directed by Willis O'Brien (who also starred in it and handled the special animation effects);  existing print runs only 12 minutes
The Goddess of Lost Lake, starring Louise Glaum
The Haunted House, produced and written by Edward Frazee, a very obscure lost film (cast unknown)
Headin' South, directed by Allan Dwan, starring Douglas Fairbanks
The Heart of Humanity, starring Erich von Stroheim
Hearts of the World, directed by D.W. Griffith, starring Lillian Gish and Dorothy Gish
The House of Mirth, directed by Albert Capellani, starring Katherine Corri Harris
Huck and Tom
The Lamb, a Harold Lloyd short.
Men Who Have Made Love to Me, starring Mary MacLane
Mickey, directed by F. Richard Jones, starring Mabel Normand
M'Liss, directed by Marshall Neilan, starring Mary Pickford and Thomas Meighan
Moonshine, a 'Fatty' Arbuckle/Buster Keaton short
My Four Years in Germany, the first film produced by the four Warner Brothers
On the Quiet, directed by Chester Withey, starring Jack Barrymore
Out of the Inkwell, an animated film directed by Max Fleischer
Out West, a 'Fatty' Arbuckle/Buster Keaton short
The Romance of Tarzan, starring Elmo Lincoln
Salomé, directed by J. Gordon Edwards, starring Theda Bara
The Silent Mystery, a 15-chapter serial directed by Francis Ford, starring Ford and Rosemary Theby;  a five-reel condensed version was also released at some point
The Sinking of the Lusitania, a short animated propaganda film by Winsor McCay; likely the longest animated film of its time.
Stella Maris, directed by Marshall Neilan, starring Mary Pickford
Tarzan of the Apes, directed by Scott Sidney, starring Elmo Lincoln and Enid Markey
The Two-Soul Woman, directed by Elmer Clifton for Universal Pictures, starring Priscilla Dean and Ashton Dearholt, based on the novel by Gelett Burgess
Uncle Tom's Cabin
Under the Yoke, directed by J. Gordon Edwards, starring Theda Bara
Under the Greenwood Tree directed by Emile Chautard starring Elsie Ferguson
The Whispering Chorus, starring Raymond Hatton and Kathlyn Williams
Why Pick on Me?, starring Harold Lloyd and Bebe Daniels

U.S.S.R. 

Cagliostro, historical melodrama directed by Wladyslaw Starevitch, starring M. Yarosh and Arseniy Bibikov, based on the novel Count Cagliostro by E. Salias
Father Sergius, directed by Yakov Protazanov, starring Ivan Mozzukhin

Comedy film series
Only the films of the series released in 1918 are collected

Buster Keaton (1917–1944)

Films starring Roscoe Arbuckle, featuring Buster Keaton released in 1918:
January 20: Out West as Sheriff / Saloon owner. 
March 18: The Bell Boy as Bellboy.

Charlie Chaplin (1914–1940)

11 August: Triple Trouble; compilation assembled by Leo White with scenes from Police and an unfinished short, Life, along with new material shot by White. Chaplin includes this production in the filmography of his autobiography.
May 1918: Chase Me Charlie; a seven-reel montage of Essanay films, edited by Langford Reed. Released in England.

Charlie Chaplin wrote, produced, directed, and starred in 9 films for his own production company between 1918 and 1923. These films were distributed by First National. Below the movies released in 1918:

14 April: A Dog's Life
29 September: The Bond
20 October: Shoulder Arms

Uncompleted and unreleased films
How to Make Movies: Never assembled, although parts were used in The Chaplin Revue (see below)Reconstructed in 1981 by Kevin Brownlow and David Gill
Untitled film: A charity film co-starring Harry Lauder.

Harold Lloyd (1913–1938)

Glasses character ("The Boy"):
The Tip 
The Lamb 
Hit Him Again 
Beat It 
A Gasoline Wedding 
Look Pleasant, Please 
Here Come the Girls 
Let's Go 
On the Jump 
Follow the Crowd 
Pipe the Whiskers as Janitor
It's a Wild Life 
Hey There! 
Kicked Out 
The Non-Stop Kid 
Two-Gun Gussie 
Fireman Save My Child 
The City Slicker 
Sic 'Em, Towser 
Somewhere in Turkey 
Are Crooks Dishonest? – sometimes wrongly titled as Doing, Doing, Done 
An Ozark Romance 
Kicking the Germ Out of Germany 
That's Him 
Bride and Gloom 
Two Scrambled 
Bees in His Bonnet 
Swing Your Partners 
Why Pick on Me? 
Nothing but Trouble 
Back to the Woods 
Hear 'Em Rave 
Take a Chance 
She Loves Me Not

Lupino Lane (1915–1939)

Short films acting as his character Mr. Butterbun released in 1918:

His Busy Day 
His Salad Days  
Love and Lobster 
The Blunders of Mr. Butterbun: Trips and Tribunals
The Blunders of Mr. Butterbun: Unexpected Treasure 
The Haunted Hotel

Births
January 29 – John Forsythe, actor (died 2010)
February 4 – Ida Lupino, actress, director (died 1995)
February 15 - Allan Arbus, actor (died 2013)
February 16 – Patty Andrews, singer, actress, member of The Andrews Sisters (died 2013)
February 19 - Fay McKenzie, American actress and singer (died 2019)
March 1 – Roger Delgado, actor (died 1973)
March 9
Marguerite Chapman, actress (died 1999)
Mickey Spillane, writer, actor (died 2006)
March 14 –Dennis Patrick, actor (died 2002) 
April 14 – Mary Healy, actress, singer (died 2015)
April 17 
William Holden, actor (died 1981)
Anne Shirley, actress (died 1993)
April 18 – Shinobu Hashimoto, screenwriter (died 2018)
May 14 – June Duprez, actress (died 1984)
May 15 – Joseph Wiseman, Canadian-American actor (died 2009)
May 20 - Patricia Ellis, American actress (died 1970)
May 21 - Jeanne Bates, American actress (died 2008)
May 26 – John Dall, actor (died 1971)
June 8 – Robert Preston, actor, singer (died 1987)
June 10 - Barry Morse, actor (died 2008)
June 11 – Jane Bryan, actress (died 2009)
June 13 - Ben Johnson, actor (died 1996)
June 15 - Elisabeth Waldo, American former musician and actress
June 21 - Adriana Sivieri, Italian actress
June 26 – Ellen Liiger, actress (died 1987)
July 6 – Sebastian Cabot, actor (died 1977)
July 8 – Craig Stevens, American actor (died 2000)
July 14 – Ingmar Bergman, Swedish actor, writer, director (died 2007)
July 16 – William Bishop, actor (died 1959)
July 18 – Jane Frazee, singer, actress (died 1985)
July 25 - Nan Grey, actress (died 1993)
July 26 – Marjorie Lord, actress (died 2015)
August 1 – Cheryl Walker, model, actress (died 1971)
August 9 – Robert Aldrich, director (died 1983)
August 17 – Evelyn Ankers, actress (died 1985)
August 25 – Richard Greene, actor (died 1985)
September – Rin Tin Tin, canine actor (died 1932)
September 13 – Dick Haymes, Argentine actor, singer (died 1980)
September 16 - Branka Veselinović, Serbian actress (died 2023)
September 21 – Rand Brooks, American actor (died 2003)
September 24 - Audra Lindley, American actress (died 1997)
September 28 – Arnold Stang, American actor and comedian (died 2009)
October 9 – Lila Kedrova, Russian-born actress (died 2000)
October 13
Yvette Thuot, Canadian actress (died 2021)
Robert Walker, actor (died 1951)
October 17 – Rita Hayworth, actress (died 1987)
October 23 - Peggy Moran, actress (died 2002)
October 25 - Milton Selzer, actor (died 2005)
October 27 – Teresa Wright, actress (died 2005)
October 29 – Diana Serra Cary, born Peggy-Jean Montgomery ("Baby Peggy"), child silent film actress (died 2020)
November 4 
Art Carney, actor (died 2003)
Cameron Mitchell, actor (died 1994)
November 27 - Stephen Elliott, actor (died 2005)
November 30 – Efrem Zimbalist Jr., actor (died 2014)
December 10 – Anne Gwynne, actress, model (died 2003)
December 15 – Jeff Chandler, actor (died 1961)

Deaths
January 8 – Johannes Pääsuke, 25, Estonian photographer and director (train crash)
January 12 – Simeon Wiltsie, American actor  
February 1 – Joseph Kaufman, 36, American silent film actor & director, married to film star Ethel Clayton  
February 15 – Vernon Castle, 30, American dancer & writer
March 13 – William Courtleigh, Jr., 26, American actor
April 30 – "Mother" Mary Maurice, 73, American veteran stage & film actress 
May 19 – S. Rankin Drew, 26, American actor and director.  
June 29 – John van den Broek, 23, Dutch cinematographer
July 4 – Walter Stradling, 43, British cinematographer
August 12 – Anna Held, 46, Polish actress & singer
September 21 – Hal August, 28, American actor; brother of Edwin August
October 2 - Edwin Arden, American stage & film actor 
October 19 – Harold Lockwood, 31, American actor
October 22 – Myrtle Gonzalez, 27, American actress
October 22 – Julian L'Estrange, 38, English actor
October 28 – Louise Vale, American actress
November 6 – William Shea, 67, Scottish veteran film actor & director
November 18 – Wayland Trask, Jr., 31, American comedian
December 6 – Charles Gunn, 35, American actor
December 29 – Jode Mullally, 32, American actor

Debuts
 Warner Baxter – All Woman(uncredited)
 Noël Coward – Hearts of the World
 Neil Hamilton – The Beloved Impostor (1918 film)
 Buck Jones – Western Blood (as Buck Gebhardt)
 Ben Lyon – The Transgressor
 Irene Rich – A Desert Wooing
 Will Rogers – Laughing Bill Hyde

References

 
Film by year